Veterans' Memorial Bridge may refer to:

United States
Veterans Memorial Bridge (Bay City, Michigan)
Veterans Memorial Bridge (Chattanooga), in Tennessee
Veterans Memorial Bridge (Neches River), connecting Port Arthur and Bridge City, Texas
Veteran's Memorial Bridge (Portland, Maine)
Siouxland Veterans Memorial Bridge, connecting Sioux City, Iowa, and South Sioux City, Nebraska
Smith County Veterans Memorial Bridge, connecting Carthage and South Carthage, Tennessee
South Omaha Veterans Memorial Bridge, connecting Nebraska and Iowa
World War II Veterans Memorial Bridge (Virginia)
Yadkin River Veterans Memorial Bridge, twin bridges (one complete) in North Carolina
Gramercy Bridge, in Gramercy, Louisiana, officially known as the Veterans Memorial Bridge

Florida
Veterans Memorial Bridge (Daytona Beach), which carries County Road 4050 traffic
Veterans Memorial Bridge (Tallahassee), in Florida
St. Johns River Veterans Memorial Bridge, connecting Sanford FL and DeBary FL

Massachusetts
Veterans Memorial Bridge (Bristol County, Massachusetts), which connects Fall River and Somerset, Massachusetts
Veterans Memorial Bridge (Essex County, Massachusetts), Salem and Beverly, Massachusetts

Missouri
Veterans Memorial Bridge (Missouri), twin bridges crossing the Missouri River in the St. Louis metropolitan area
Martin Luther King Bridge (St. Louis), Missouri, formerly known as the Veterans Memorial Bridge
Stan Musial Veterans Memorial Bridge, carrying Interstate 70 across the Mississippi River at St. Louis

New York
Veterans Memorial Bridge (Rochester, New York)
Cross Bay Veterans Memorial Bridge in New York, New York
Walden Veterans' Memorial Bridge in Walden, New York

Ohio
Veterans Memorial Bridge (Steubenville, Ohio), connecting Steubenville to Weirton, WV
Detroit–Superior Bridge in Cleveland, Ohio, officially known as the Veterans Memorial Bridge

Pennsylvania
Veterans Memorial Bridge (Oil City, Pennsylvania)
Veterans Memorial Bridge (Sunbury, Pennsylvania), to Shamokin Dam, Pennsylvania
Columbia-Wrightsville Bridge, Columbia and Wrightsville, Pennsylvania

See also
Veterans Bridge (disambiguation)
Midpoint Memorial Bridge, in Fort Myers, Florida, which carries Veterans Memorial Parkway